The Minister of Finance of the Republic of Indonesia (Indonesian: Menteri Keuangan) is the head of the Indonesian Ministry of Finance. The minister is tasked with organizing government affairs in the field of state finances to assist the President in administering state government.

The current Minister of Finance is Sri Mulyani Indrawati, who has served in the position since 27 July 2016. The minister is supported by the a Deputy Ministers of Finance, Suahasil Nazara.

List of ministers 
The following are a list of persons and politicians who have been appointed as the Minister of Finance in Indonesia.Legend:

Notes

References

See also 
 Cabinet of Indonesia
 Ministry of Finance

Government ministers of Indonesia